Valeri Pavlovich Butenko (16 July 1941 – 13 February 2020) was a Russian football midfielder and referee, and a Master of Sports of the USSR, known for having acted as referee at one 1986 FIFA World Cup Group D match - the game between Algeria and Northern Ireland on 3 June 1986. After retiring, Butenko served as a match supervisor. His younger brother Andrei Butenko was a football referee as well.

References

External links
Profile
Short bio
Biography at Yandex Dictionary

1941 births
2020 deaths
Russian football referees
Soviet football referees
FIFA World Cup referees
1986 FIFA World Cup referees
Footballers from Moscow
Russian footballers
Soviet footballers
Association football midfielders